Heydarabad (also Romanized as Ḩeydarābād) is a village in Chelleh Khaneh Rural District, Sufian District, Shabestar County, East Azerbaijan Province, Iran. At the 2006 census, its population was 115, in 29 families.

References 

Populated places in Shabestar County